Buettneria is a monotypic genus of bush cricket, in the tribe Phlaurocentrini, found in the Democratic Republic of the Congo and Cameroon;  the single species is Buettneria maculiceps.

References

Phaneropterinae
Orthoptera of Africa
Insects of Cameroon
Insects of the Democratic Republic of the Congo
Insects described in 1889
Taxa named by Ferdinand Karsch
Monotypic Orthoptera genera